Maite Martínez Pérez (born 24 November 1967) is a Spanish former professional tennis player.

Martínez reached a career high singles ranking of 206 in the world and won three ITF titles. She made her only WTA Tour main draw appearance at the 1991 Spanish Open, held in Barcelona.

ITF finals

Singles: 3 (3–0)

References

External links
 
 

1967 births
Living people
Spanish female tennis players